Marjorie Villis (1891–1981), was a British film actress of the silent era.

Selected filmography
 Sally Bishop (1916)
 A Romany Lass (1918)
 The Silver Greyhound (1919)
 The Power of Right (1919)
 The Man Who Forgot (1919)
 Brenda of the Barge (1920)
 Sister Brown (1921)
 The Education of Nicky (1921)
 Love in the Welsh Hills (1921)
 No. 7 Brick Row (1922)

References

Bibliography
 Low, Rachael. The History of British Film The History of the British Film 1914 - 1918. Routledge, 2013.

External links

1891 births
1981 deaths
English film actresses
English silent film actresses
20th-century English actresses